Mamangam may refer to:
 Mamankam festival or Māmāngam, a duodecennial medieval fair held at Tirunāvāya, southern India
 Mamangam (TV series), an Indian Malayalam-language television series 
 Mamangam (film), a 2019 Indian Malayalam-language period action film

See also
 Maamaankam, a 1979 Indian Malayalam-language historical drama film